The Men's sprint event of the 2008 UCI Track Cycling World Championships was held on 27 and 28 March 2008.

Results

Qualifying (200 m time trial)

1/16 finals

1/8 finals

1/8 finals repechage

Quarter finals

Semi finals

Finals

Race for 5th–8th places

References

External links
 Full results at Tissottiming.com

Men's sprint
UCI Track Cycling World Championships – Men's sprint